General elections were held in Ecuador on 1 June 1952. The presidential elections were won by José María Velasco Ibarra of the National Velasquista Federation–Ecuadorian Nationalist Revolutionary Action alliance. His term started on 1 September.

Results

President

House of Representatives

References

Elections in Ecuador
1952 in Ecuador
Ecuador
June 1952 events in South America
Election and referendum articles with incomplete results